Wamokia is a genus of millipedes belonging to the family Xystodesmidae.

The species of this genus are found in Western North America.

Species:

Wamokia dentata 
Wamokia discordis 
Wamokia falcata 
Wamokia hoffmani 
Wamokia placerna 
Wamokia remota 
Wamokia sierrae

References

Xystodesmidae